GD X Taeyang (also known as GDYB) is a South Korean duo from YG Entertainment, consisting of G-Dragon and Taeyang from Big Bang. After several years of appearing on each other's solo materials, the duo officially released the single "Good Boy" in 2014, which went on to top Billboards World Digital Songs chart and sold over a million digital units in South Korea.

History
Kwon Ji-yong and Dong Young-bae first met as trainees at YG Entertainment.  After signing a contract with the record label, they spent the first year cleaning the studio and fetching water bottles during dance practices for YG artists. Dong later admitted that current artists at the time weren't friendly towards him or Kwon. The original plan for the two was to debut as the hip-hop duo GDYB, with Kwon choosing the stage name G-Dragon ("Ji" is pronounced like "G" and Yong is Korean for "dragon"). Though they made several appearances both as a duo and as individuals on other artists' music, the plan for their debut was scrapped and they were joined by four other trainees (T.O.P, Daesung, Seungri and Jang Hyun-seung) to form BigBang instead. The formation of the group was documented on television, but prior to their official debut, Jang was dropped. Dong later adopted the stage name Taeyang. Member Seungri later admitted that G-Dragon was initially cold towards Daesung and himself because G-Dragon had wanted to be in the hip hop duo and disliked being placed in a band. Taeyang himself was also initially hesitant about being placed in a band but eventually warmed up to the other members.

Despite activities with their band, the duo continued to collaborate with one another outside of BigBang's materials, with G-Dragon participating as a writer and producer for Taeyang's first extended play Hot (2008), after which G-Dragon subsequently recorded a "Part Two" to the EP's lead single "Only Look at Me" (Korean: 나만바라봐; Revised Romanization: Naman Barabwa). Later, G-Dragon had a rap verse on Taeyang's single "I Need a Girl". Taeyang returned the favor by appearing in the song "Korean Dream" for G-Dragon's first album Heartbreaker (2009).  G-Dragon later wrote and produced several songs for Taeyang's first and second albums Solar (2010) and Rise (2014).

An official collaboration between the two as the subunit GD x Taeyang emerged in 2014 with the song "Good Boy," which reached number one on Billboards World Digital Songs, making it the third time a Korean act had topped the chart after PSY and 2NE1. The single accrued 1.2 million downloads in South Korea, and its music video accumulated over 100 million views on the video-sharing website YouTube. In 2015, the duo participated in the Infinite Challenge music festival, teaming up with ZE:A's Hwang Kwanghee for the single "Mapsosa", which peaked at number two on the Gaon Digital Chart and sold 1.3 million copies by the end of the year, making it one of the best-selling songs of 2015.

Discography

Single albums

DVDs

Singles

Other collaborations

Awards and nominations

Notes

References

External links
 

G-Dragon
Taeyang
K-pop music groups
South Korean musical duos
South Korean hip hop groups
South Korean pop music groups
South Korean dance music groups
South Korean boy bands
Musical groups from Seoul
Musical groups established in 2014
YG Entertainment artists
2014 establishments in South Korea